Geho Run is a stream in the U.S. state of West Virginia.

Geho Run most likely was named after one Mr. Geho, the proprietor of a local blacksmith shop.

See also
List of rivers of West Virginia

References

Rivers of Nicholas County, West Virginia
Rivers of West Virginia